Pursuit of Happiness is the thirteenth album from Arthur Loves Plastic and was released in 2006.

Awards 
Pursuit of Happiness won the 2006 Wammie for Best Recording in the Electronica Category.

Release notes 
"Pursuit of Happiness is more thrills than dual piano with Condoleezza..."

Album cover 
Amazon.com initially refused to stock the album because the "cover art goes beyond what (they are) willing to accept". The album was subsequently made available from Amazon.com with a blank album cover.

Reissue 
Following a request by Laura Burhenn to remove the ALP remixes of her tracks on the album; Pursuit of Happiness was reissued on 22 March 2010 without the tracks "Meltdown (Freedom Mix)" and "Just for the Night (Can't Hide My Love Mix)", but with the addition of the new track "Alone Till the Day I Die (Snow Mix)" and "family-friendly" cover art.

Track listing 
All songs written and composed by Bev Stanton, except where noted.

Original release

2010 reissue

Original release personnel 
Produced by Bev Stanton in the Flamingo Room, Silver Spring, MD.
Mastered by Bill Wolf, Wolf Productions, Arlington VA.

Additional musicians 
Heather Heimbuch - Vocals (1)
Mental Anguish - Loops (2, 5) *
Virus Factory - Loops (3, 11) *
Omnitechnomatrix - Loops (7) *
The Magical Cigarette - Loops (9) *
Heuristics Inc. - Loops (9) *
Robbie Magruder - Drums (9)
Lisa Moscatiello - Vocals (9)
Buzzsaw & The Shavings - Loops (11) *

* Remixed for The Tapegerm Collective

References 

Arthur Loves Plastic albums
2006 albums